Prophets, Seers & Sages: The Angels of the Ages is the second studio album by English psychedelic folk band Tyrannosaurus Rex (later known as T. Rex). It was released on 14 October 1968 by record label Regal Zonophone.

Recording 

Prophets, Seers & Sages was recorded from April to August 1968 at Trident Studios in London, England and was produced by Tony Visconti.

Music 

Prophets, Seers & Sages featured Marc Bolan on vocals and guitar and Steve Peregrin Took on bongos, African drums, kazoo, pixiephone and Chinese gong.

The album opened with a revisiting of Tyrannosaurus Rex's first single "Debora", altered by a reversed-tape effect, as indicated by its new title "Deboraarobed".

Release 

Prophets, Seers & Sages was released on 14 October 1968 by record label Regal Zonophone, but failed to chart upon first release.

The album was released in both mono and stereo editions; on the labels, "Oh Harley (the Saltimbanques)" was spelled "O Harley (the Saltimbanques)".

The album was paired with the first Tyrannosaurus Rex album, My People Were Fair and Had Sky in Their Hair... But Now They're Content to Wear Stars on Their Brows (1968), and re-released by Fly Records as a double album on 14 April 1972, following the success of the T. Rex albums Electric Warrior (1971) and The Slider (1972). This re-released edition of the album reached No. 1 in the UK Albums Chart. This double LP set was released in the United States on A&M Records titled Tyrannosaurus Rex: A Beginning, and was the first time the albums were available there.

Reception and legacy 

In a retrospective review, AllMusic wrote that "the album delivered some of Marc Bolan's most resonant songs". "The already classic pop of the opening "Deboraarobed" is further dignified by its segue into the same performance played backwards, a fairly groundbreaking move at a time when even the Beatles were still burying such experiments deep in the mix". The reviewer concluded saying, "Bolan simply made one up, and in the process created a whole new language -- half nonsense, half mystery, but wholly intoxicating. Tiny Mix Tapes wrote that it was a psychedelic folk album with  "intense bongo action" and "strong backing vocals" . The reviewer added that "Prophets, remains a timeless album for everyone" and its original arrangements ensured it "a long life for many generations to come".

"Debora", the original recording of "Deboraarobed", features in Edgar Wright's 2017 film Baby Driver.

Track listing

References

External links 

 

T. Rex (band) albums
1968 albums
Albums produced by Tony Visconti
Regal Zonophone Records albums
Albums recorded at Trident Studios